Tiberius was the second Roman emperor. The term may also refer to:

 Tiberius (praenomen), Roman personal name

Roman persons named Tiberius
 Tiberius II Constantine, Byzantine emperor 578–582
 Tiberius III (Apsimar), Byzantine emperor 698–705
 Tiberius Claudius Nero (disambiguation) 
 Tiberius Coruncanius, consul 280 BC and military commander known for the battles against Pyrrhus of Epirus that led to the expression "Pyrrhic victory"
 Tiberius Gemellus, grandson of emperor Tiberius I
 Tiberius Sempronius Gracchus (disambiguation)
 Tiberius (son of Maurice) (died 602), executed by Phocas
 Tiberius (son of Constans II), Byzantine co-emperor 659–681
 Tiberius (son of Justinian II), Byzantine co-emperor 706–711
 David (son of Heraclius), Byzantine co-emperor (641), briefly assumed the regnal name Tiberius
 Basil Onomagoulos, Byzantine rebel and usurper in Sicily (717), assumed the regnal name Tiberius
 Tiberius Petasius, Byzantine usurper in Italy (730/731) 
 Tiberius of Agde, Christian martyr and Saint, died 303 AD
Other historical persons named Tiberius
 Tiberius Hemsterhuis, Dutch philologist and critic
 Tiberius Velianas, mentioned in the Pyrgi Tablets

Fictional persons named Tiberius
 James T. Kirk, full name James Tiberius Kirk. Captain of the starship USS Enterprise (Star Trek)
 Emperor Tiberius, the counterpart of James T. Kirk from the Mirror Universe (Star Trek)
 Lucius Tiberius, fictional Roman Emperor from Arthurian Legend appearing first in Geoffrey of Monmouth's Historia Regum Britanniae
 Commander Lyle Tiberius Rourke, a character in Disney's Atlantis: The Lost Empire
 Tiberius, a red tailed hawk in The Secret Life of Pets
 Tiberius Stormwind from Draconia, a red dragonborn sorcerer in the D&D Web Series Critical Role
 Tiberius "Ty" Blackthorn (The Shadowhunter Chronicles) a 2007-present book franchise by Cassandra Clare.

Other uses
 Tiberius (Massie novel), a 1991 historical novel by Allan Massie
 
 Operation Tiberius, an investigation into systemic corruption, perversion of justice and bribery in the United Kingdom's police force
 Tiberius Bede (disambiguation), two 8th-century manuscripts of Bede's Historia ecclesiastica gentis Anglorum in the Cotton library

See also
 Tiberias, an ancient city in Israel named for Tiberius, the second Roman emperor